Uranium(IV) hydride is a chemical compound with the chemical formula UH4, a metal hydride composed of uranium and hydrogen. 

In 1997, Souter et al. reported the production of UH4 reacting laser ablated uranium atoms with dihydrogen and capturing the product on solid argon. The assignment of the structure was made using infrared spectroscopic evidence supported by DFT calculations. Uranium(IV) hydride has a quasi-tetrahedral (Cs) structure. UH4 is formed by the successive insertion of uranium into two hydrogen molecules:

U + H2 → UH2
UH2 + H2 → UH4

Further reaction with hydrogen, only produces dihydrogen complexes: UH4(H2)n (1 ≤ n ≤ 6).

References 

Uranium(IV) compounds
Metal hydrides